is a fictional character in Resident Evil (Biohazard in Japan), a survival horror video game series created by Japanese company Capcom. He is first introduced in the original Resident Evil (1996), in which he is the captain of the Raccoon Police Department's Special Tactics And Rescue Service (S.T.A.R.S) unit. His character is further explored in subsequent installments, which greatly expand his role in the series' extensive narrative.

Introduced in the first game, Wesker has been one of the main antagonists throughout the series, where he usually manipulates story events behind-the-scenes. Wesker seeks to replace humanity through mass extinction and forced evolution, believing humanity to be at an evolutionary dead end. To this end, he is affiliated with the Umbrella Corporation as one of its most promising researchers, and at the same time participates in illicit activities by going undercover as a S.T.A.R.S captain in Raccoon City. Through the course of much betrayal of his allies to further his own plans, Wesker fakes his death, gains superhuman abilities from an experimental variant of the Progenitor virus, and works with both Umbrella's mysterious rival company and their successors in the field of biological weapons development, TRICELL, until his ultimate defeat by Chris Redfield in Resident Evil 5 (2009). 

Wesker appears in several Resident Evil games and novelizations. In the live-action film series, Wesker is portrayed by Jason O'Mara, Shawn Roberts and Tom Hopper. In Netflix's live-action television series, set in its own original universe but using the video game series as its backstory and basis, several clones of Wesker, portrayed by Lance Reddick, are revealed to have been produced before and after his death, with one having two daughters, Jade and Billie Wesker.

Wesker has received mostly positive reviews from video game publications, with critics praising him for being a memorable villain in the franchise.

Appearances

In Resident Evil games
Wesker made his first appearance as a non-playable character in the original Resident Evil game. In that game, he is the commanding officer of Alpha team of the Special Tactics And Rescue Service (STARS), where he initially helps the player by leaving supplies and useful information. Wesker is eventually revealed to be a double agent working for the Umbrella Corporation; ordered by his superiors to lure the STARS into the Spencer mansion to be used as test subjects against the mutated creatures to gather battle data, although he later implies that this was itself a cover for his own agenda regarding stealing Umbrella's research. Chris Redfield, Jill Valentine and the others come to learn of Wesker's true motive, but after releasing the Tyrant monster, Wesker is seemingly killed. The Sega Saturn port of Resident Evil features a Battle Mode minigame where the player can fight a zombified version of Wesker.

However, this is part of an even bigger plan. In the special giveaway fictional documentary titled Wesker's Report (rewritten in 2003 to include details from Resident Evil 0 and the Resident Evil remake), Wesker reveals that he planned to sell the Tyrant to Umbrella's rival company in the B.O.W. field as a means to buy his way into a high position, and he deployed the elite STARS against it in order to obtain combat data to prove the Tyrant's effectiveness to the company. However, his plan was ruined after the Tyrant was destroyed by his former subordinates, and he survived his apparent death in the first game by injecting himself beforehand with an experimental variant of the T-virus, provided by his former Umbrella colleague William Birkin, that revived and augmented him with superhuman strength, speed and regeneration, but at the expense of his humanity. Wesker returned in Resident Evil – Code: Veronica, augmented with superhuman powers and working as an agent for "H.C.F." (Hive/Host Capture Force), a Special Forces unit of the rival company opposed to Umbrella. He orchestrates a raid on Rockfort Island in order to capture Alexia Ashford, creator of the T-Veronica virus who now holds the only remaining sample of the virus within her body. When Chris Redfield knocks his sunglasses off during a brief struggle, Wesker's orange, almost reptilian eyes are seen for the first time. He confronts both Chris and Alexia and he took the corpse of Steve Burnside in order to extract the T-Veronica virus. In the expanded release, Code: Veronica X, he briefly confronts Chris's younger sister Claire and nearly kills her in order to torment Chris, but is called away by his associates and thus chooses to spare her life.

Wesker then appeared alongside William Birkin in Resident Evil Zero, a prequel to the original game where it is revealed that he attended the Umbrella Executive Training School as a prospective executive, and later in Resident Evil 4 as a conspirator manipulating events from behind the scenes, where he would issue orders to Ada Wong. He is also unlockable in "The Mercenaries" scenario. He is also the protagonist of Resident Evil: The Umbrella Chronicles and a playable character in several of the game's scenarios, expanding upon events alluded to in early games, as well as his involvement in Umbrella's downfall after the events of Code: Veronica and his development in Resident Evil 4. In the end he kills Sergei Vladimir, a loyal Umbrella executive. Wesker also very briefly appears in Resident Evil: The Darkside Chronicles, as he at one point is seen by Jack Krauser. He also gave Javier a sample of the virus within Steve Burnside.

Wesker returns in Resident Evil 5 conspiring with the pharmaceutical division of the TRICELL conglomerate as a means to create the "Uroboros virus", an enhanced virus derived from the Progenitor virus, with which he ultimately plans to release into the Earth's atmosphere. Before being killed by Wesker, Oswell Spencer reveals that Wesker was the survivor of a Progenitor virus variant administration experiment—the "Wesker Project." (It is stated in the RE5 downloadable content "Lost in Nightmares" that another Wesker, Alex, survived as well). He would eventually enact a plot to transform the human race into powerful superhumans like himself, and be a god to rule over them in a new age. Chris and Sheva Alomar prevent the worldwide infection and ultimately kill Wesker inside a volcano at the end of the game. Masachika Kawata, the game's producer, confirmed that Wesker perished in the game's finale. 

Wesker appears in the spin-off title Resident Evil: The Mercenaries 3D as a playable character along with various other Resident Evil characters. His voice is heard on the 15th anniversary special video narrating the events. He has a son named Jake Muller who is introduced in Resident Evil 6. D. C. Douglas, Wesker's voice actor, had a cameo voice role in Umbrella Corps,  which takes place after the events of Resident Evil 6. When asked if Wesker's character would return in future Resident Evil games, Douglas responded, "We have no idea. And we wouldn't. We're only working on this game."

Wesker is also featured in Resident Evil: Revelations 2 as a playable character in Raid Mode, presented in-universe as a virtual simulator. The primary antagonist of the main game is Alex Wesker, the only other survivor out of the Wesker children. Albert is briefly shown in the main story in a portrait with Alex. He also received an indirect mention in Resident Evil 7: Biohazard, where it was revealed that his H.C.F. group was involved in the creation of Eveline during the 2000s.

In Resident Evil films

Wesker's character was adapted for the 2007 live-action film Resident Evil: Extinction. Played by Jason O'Mara, this version of Wesker is the head of the Umbrella Corporation, as opposed to Wesker's role in the games as a renegade high-ranking Umbrella researcher. He runs Umbrella's operations from behind the scenes, holding meetings via hologram with his underground board of directors in Tokyo. Originally, Wesker's character was not intended to be in the film, with his role and lines in the script being given by Commander Okamoto.

Shawn Roberts took over the role of Wesker in 2010's Resident Evil: Afterlife as a main antagonist of the film, where the character is closer to his Code Veronica and especially his Resident Evil 5 incarnations, complete with superhuman strength, speed, healing and glowing red eyes; he even wears the same outfit as in the latter game. Wesker says some of his lines from the game as well, and the fight between Wesker and Chris and Claire Redfield in the film is an almost shot-for-shot remake of a fight between Wesker and Chris and Sheva in Resident Evil 5.

He later appears in Resident Evil: Retribution as a defector from Umbrella, who sends Ada Wong to rescue Alice from an underground Russian Umbrella outpost run by the Red Queen who has taken over the rest of Umbrella. Wesker returns in the sixth film, Resident Evil: The Final Chapter, having betrayed Alice and killed everyone at the White House. Guided by the Red Queen, Alice returns to the Hive where Umbrella has developed a potent antivirus. In a confrontation in the Hive, Alicia Marcus fires Wesker, enabling the Red Queen to crush his legs with a blast door, trapping Wesker. Before leaving to chase Doctor Alexander Isaacs, Alice primes the detonator for the explosives she planted around the Hive and leaves it in Wesker's hand. Wesker eventually dies of blood loss, causing him to lose his grip on the detonator. Without Wesker holding the detonator, Alice's explosives destroy the Hive, killing everyone within including Alicia Marcus, the Umbrella High Command and thousands of others held in stasis.

In the reboot film Resident Evil: Welcome to Raccoon City (2021), Wesker is played by Tom Hopper as a police officer at Raccoon Police Department and secondary antagonist while being considerably more sympathetic.  In addition, Wesker is also the Captain of the S.T.A.R.S. Alpha Team. Before the events of the film, he was approached by a mysterious woman (revealed to be Ada Wong in a post-credits scene) who asks him to do a job behind his fellow teammates' back - find a research lab belonging to Dr. William Birkin of Umbrella. During the raid on the Arkley Mansion, Birkin and Wesker shoot each other over the G-virus resulting in Wesker getting shot and presumably killed by his partner Jill Valentine. A remorseful Wesker pleads to her to get out before Umbrella destroys Raccoon City to cover up it's experiments. During the post-credit scene, Wesker is then reanimated by Ada by a retrovirus.

In Resident Evil television series
Lance Reddick plays Dr. Albert Wesker in the live action Resident Evil series from Netflix. Set after the events of the Resident Evil 5 video game, several clones of Wesker (notably "Albert", Bert", and "Alby") are revealed to have been produced before and after his death, with one having two daughters: Jade and Billie Wesker. Due to the cloning process, Wesker clones need to counteract degenerative aging, which Wesker does by injecting himself with Jade and Billie's blood. Set in modern day, Umbrella under Evelyn Marcus invited Al Wesker onto their board to begin further trials into the experimental anti-depressant "Joy", this required the family to move across the Atlantic to "New Raccoon City", a suburban company town in South Africa. Immediately after arriving at Umbrella HQ he was apprised of the company's more serious, confidential problem - an outbreak of T-virus at a plant in Tijuana. During the series, Al realizes Billie is immune after an encounter with a infected dog and wants to apply it to a T Virus vaccine to counteract the traits of the virus in Joy putting him against Marcus. Wesker sacrifices himself to destroy the HQ, but not before sending the twins with Bert to escape.

Other appearances

Albert Wesker appears in the crossover fighting game Marvel vs. Capcom 3: Fate of Two Worlds as a playable character and a key character in the game's plot, in which he joins forces with Doctor Doom as the two build an army of supervillains, attempting to merge the two dimensions in the hopes of conquering both. During the final battle, if Wesker is not one of the playable characters, he will also be revealed to be one of Galactus' heralds along with Doom, Marvel villain Dormammu, and fellow Capcom villain Akuma. He also makes a guest appearance as an unlockable character skin in Lost Planet 2. An action figure of Wesker was released by Palisades Toys in 2002. Two more were released by Hot Toys in 2009. In 2016, D. C. Douglas reprised the role in Jim Sterling's short comedy horror film JimSAW. Wesker appears as a Spirit in the Nintendo crossover video game Super Smash Bros. Ultimate. Wesker appears as a playable killer in Dead by Daylight as of September 2022.

Reception
The character of Albert Wesker has been well received by video game publications. In 2006, IGN ranked Wesker number three on their list of most memorable villains, claiming that "Res Evil fans know that whenever Wesker shows up, trouble isn't far behind," and also ranked him as the 14th-best video game villain in 2010. In 2008, GamePro ranked Wesker as the 40th-most diabolical video game villain of all time. An IGN article from March 2010 titled "Big Boss of the Day: Resident Evil's Albert Wesker" discussed his appearances across the franchise, comparing him with other video game villains including Bowser and Sephiroth as well commenting it is strange to have a Resident Evil without him. GameSpot featured him in the "All-Time Greatest Game Villains" poll, where Wesker lost to Ganondorf from The Legend of Zelda. In 2009, GamesRadar listed Wesker as one of the top seven characters who never stay dead, describing him as the "proverbial man behind the curtain" in the Resident Evil series. Similarly, 1UP.com also placed him number eight in their article "They is Risen" in response to his apparent resurrection in the Resident Evil series. GamesRadar gave praise to Wesker's death in Resident Evil 5 as it showed the character's strength due to the requirements to defeat him while D. C. Douglas's performance as the character also received positive comments during the self-bloopers from the series. According to PlayStation Universe, "From his perpetual shades, stoic persona and swanky haircut, Wesker has all the makings of an iconic—albeit somewhat stereotypical—videogame villain." The same source also compares Wesker's role in Resident Evil 4 to that of James Bond villain Ernst Stavro Blofeld. In the January 2010 issue, Nintendo Power named Wesker the ninth best villain in Nintendo history. GamesRadar also praised Wesker's role as an antagonist, putting him in their 2013 list of the best villains in video game history at number 13. In 2013, GamesRadar staff included him among the 30 best characters in the three decades of Capcom's history and wrote that with his appearance as a playable character in Marvel vs. Capcom 3, "even after his death in RE5, Albert Wesker shows no signs of stopping, which is just the way we like it." GamesRadar staff described Albert Wesker as the best villain in video games, stating that "Wesker is known for a scarred psyche, superhuman strength and speed, and a sexy pair of sunglasses." Guinness World Records Gamer's Edition listed Albert Wesker as 12th in their list of top 50 Villains.
 
On the other hand, Play listed such fight as the third-worst boss fight in the PlayStation 3 games, emphasizing how many times the player had to fight him until he is defeated. 1UP.com also ranked him as the top thing in the series that Resident Evil 5 "could do without" prior to its release. The PlayStation Official Magazine shared this opinion and ranked Wesker as the ninth-worst PlayStation boss fight ever. In 2012, Complex ranked him as the "second-douchiest" video game character, stating, "Wesker has a following, yes, but there's something very Agent Smith about him that makes us shake our heads."

See also
 List of Resident Evil characters

Notes

References

External links

Albert Wesker at the Internet Movie Database

 

Action film characters
Capcom antagonists
Fictional American people in video games
Fictional business executives
Fictional businesspeople in video games
Fictional characters with death or rebirth abilities
Fictional criminals in video games
Fictional double agents
Fictional mass murderers
Fictional murderers
Fictional police officers in video games
Fictional terrorists
Fictional toxicologists
Fictional virologists
Fictional warlords in video games
Fictional zombie hunters
Genetically engineered characters in video games
Horror video game characters
Mad scientist characters in video games
Male characters in video games
Male film villains
Male video game villains
Fictional war criminals
Mutant characters in video games
Police misconduct in fiction
Resident Evil characters
Science fiction film characters
Video game bosses
Video game characters introduced in 1996
Video game characters who can move at superhuman speeds
Video game characters with accelerated healing
Video game characters with superhuman strength